Kalina krasnaya is a Russian expression which describes the Viburnum opulus (Russian: Калина , Kalina Krasnaya or Кали́на обыкнове́нная, Kalina obyknovennaya).

The term kalina describes the berry and krasnaya the color red. Viburnum opulus (kalina) is an important element of the Russian folk culture. Kalina derived in Russian language from kalit''' or raskalyat', which means "to make red-hot". In Old Russian language the word for beautiful and red were completely identical. In the modern Russian language, the terms for red and beautiful are still strongly connected linguistically. Krasnaya (Russian: кра́сная) means red and is connected in modern Russian language to beautiful (Russian: красиво).

The expression kalina krasnaya which means red viburnum is a symbol for love, beauty, youth, luck and passion and feelings people seek to feel. It represents one side of the Mother Rusĭ. A kalina berry can also symbolize a transition to the opposite, emotions and emotional worlds that feel painful for people, like sadness and grief (Горькая Калина, gor'kaya kalina).

In Russian folklore, Kalina Krasnaya'' is the subject of many songs and poems.

References

Russian folklore